Brian Perez (born 16 September 1986) is a Gibraltarian footballer who plays for Gibraltar Premier Division side Bruno's Magpies and the Gibraltar national team, where he plays as a midfielder.

International career

On 7 September 2014, Perez made his international début for Gibraltar in a UEFA Euro 2016 Group D qualifying match against Poland with Gibraltar losing 7-0.

International statistics
.

Personal life

Perez works for an Electrical Department in Gibraltar.

References

External links
 
 

1986 births
Living people
Gibraltarian footballers
Gibraltar international footballers
F.C. Bruno's Magpies players
Manchester 62 F.C. players
Lincoln Red Imps F.C. players
Association football midfielders
Gibraltar Premier Division players